The San Diego Film Critics Society Award for Best Actor is an award given by the San Diego Film Critics Society to honor the finest male acting achievementes in film-making.

Winners

1990s

2000s

2010s

2020s

References
San Diego Film Critics Society  - Awards

Film awards for lead actor